Rosalind A. McKnight (January 8, 1934 - February 11, 2010) is the author of Soul Journeys and Cosmic Journeys.

Biography
McKnight was interested in the nonphysical dimensions of consciousness. With out-of-body researcher Robert Monroe, the founder of the Monroe Institute, she studied human consciousness and wrote about her experiences.

References

1934 births
2010 deaths
American women writers
21st-century American women